Galina  Klimentevna  Makarova (real name   Agatha);  , ; December 27, 1919 — September 28, 1993) was a Soviet Belarusian theater and film actress. People's Artist of the USSR (1980).

Born December 27, 1919 in the Starobin village  (now Salihorsk Raion, Minsk Oblast, Belarus).

The first success in the theater comes to the actress in 1954.

Filming a movie actress began in 1958. Her first star role in film was the role of Alexandra Matveyevna Gromova in the film by Sergei Mikaelyan Widows in 1976.

Galina Makarova died September 28, 1993, at her dacha near Minsk (other sources say she died in Moscow). She was buried in Minsk on the Vostochnoye Cemetery.

Selected filmography 
 1958 — Happiness Should be Protected as   Kandybovich's wife  
 1960 — Ahead   a Sharp Turn as school nurse
 1965 — Alpine Ballad   as Pelagia
 1970 / 1972 — Ruins Shoot... as woman near a temporary camp (uncredited)
 1976 — Widows as Alexandra Matveyevna Gromova 
 1978 — Young Wife as a grandmother Agasha
 1982 — Department as Darya Stepanovna
 1983 — White Dew as Matrona
 1984 — The Unknown Soldier as Klavdiya Grigorievna Ivantsova
 1985 — Do Not Marry, Girls  as chumichka
 1985 — Confrontation as Claudia Egorovna Efremova
 1985 —  Farewell of a Slav Woman  as Anna Ivanovna
 1986 — Summer Impressions of Planet Z as Marivanna
 1987 — The Garden of Desires as grandma
 1992 — White Dress as Praskovya

References

External links
 
 Галина Макарова всю жизнь любила первого мужа // KP.RU

1919 births
1993 deaths
People from Salihorsk District
Soviet actresses
20th-century Belarusian actresses
Belarusian film actresses
Belarusian stage actresses
People's Artists of the USSR
Recipients of the Order of Lenin